This is a list of Brazilian television related events from 1999.

Events
10 May - Rede Manchete shut down.
15 November - RedeTV! just launched.

Debuts

Television shows

1970s
Turma da Mônica (1976-present)

1990s
Malhação (1995-present)
Cocoricó (1996-present)

Ending this year

Births

Deaths

See also
1999 in Brazil